Ljerka Belak (13 February 1948 – 21 April 2021) was a Slovenian actress. She won a Prešeren Award in 1989.

References

1948 births
2021 deaths
Slovenian actresses
Prešeren Award laureates
University of Ljubljana alumni
People from Ljubljana